This is a list of Friends meeting houses.  Numerous Friends meeting houses are individually notable, either for their congregations or events or for architecture of their historic buildings.  Some in the United Kingdom are registered as listed buildings, and in the United States are listed on the National Register of Historic Places.

Australia
Friends Meeting House, Adelaide

France

Meeting house, Congénies

United Kingdom

Britain Yearly Meeting is the organization of Quakers in England, Scotland, Wales, the Isle of Man, and the Channel Islands.  Several meeting houses have been listed for their architectural merit. Notable individual meeting houses include:
Adderbury Meeting House, Oxfordshire, listed Grade II*
Amersham Meeting House (1689), Buckinghamshire, listed Grade II*
Blackheath Quaker Meeting House (1972), London, listed Grade II
Briggflatts Meeting House (1675), Cumbria, second oldest in England
Brighton Friends Meeting House (1805), East Sussex
Farfield Friends Meeting House (1689), West Yorkshire, a former Quaker meeting house
Finchley Meeting House (1967), London
Friends Meeting House, Come-to-Good (1710), Cornwall
Ifield Friends Meeting House (1676), West Sussex, listed Grade I
Jordans Meeting House (1688), Buckinghamshire
Leek Quaker Meeting (1848), Staffordshire
Littlehampton Friends Meeting House, West Sussex, listed Grade II*
Osmotherley Friends Meeting House (1723), North Yorkshire, listed Grade II
Stafford Quaker Meeting (1730), Staffordshire, a listed building
Uttoxeter and Burton Quaker Meeting (1706), Staffordshire
Warwick Meeting House, Warwickshire, listed Grade II*

Former meeting houses
Several meeting houses are no longer in use by Friends, but are still listed buildings:
Brandeston Meeting House, Suffolk, listed Grade II
Brigstock House, Northamptonshire, listed Grade II
Quakers Friars, listed Grade I
The Old Meeting House, Wymondham, Norfolk (1687) Grade II

United States
Delaware
Appoquinimink Friends Meetinghouse, Odessa
Camden Friends Meetinghouse, Camden, Kent County
Centre Meeting and Schoolhouse, Centerville
Friends Meetinghouse (Wilmington, Delaware), Wilmington, (part of Quaker Hill Historic District (Wilmington, Delaware))
Hockessin Friends Meetinghouse, Hockessin, New Castle County
Mill Creek Friends Meetinghouse, Newark, New Castle County
Florida
Miami Friends Meeting, Miami
Orlando Friends Meeting, Orlando
Winter Park Friends Meeting, Winter Park
Illinois
Benjaminville Friends Meeting House and Burial Ground, Benjaminville, McLean County
Iowa
Coal Creek Friends' Meetinghouse, Mahaska County Historical Society/Nelson Pioneer Farm & Museum, Oskaloosa, Iowa
Honey Creek Friends' Meetinghouse, New Providence
Kentucky
Berea Friends Meeting, Madison County
Maine
Casco Friends Meeting House, Casco
Maple Grove Friends Church, Fort Fairfield
River Meetinghouse, Vassalsboro
Maryland
Bethesda Meeting House, Bethesda, Montgomery County
Colora Meetinghouse, Colora, Cecil County
Deer Creek Friends Meetinghouse, Darlington, Harford County
East Nottingham Friends Meetinghouse, Rising Sun, Cecil County, (also known as Brick Meetinghouse)
Little Falls Meetinghouse, Fallston, Harford County
Neck Meetinghouse and Yard, West Denton, Caroline County
Old Town Friends' Meetinghouse, Baltimore, (also known as Aisquith Street Meeting, Baltimore Meeting or Patapsco)
Pipe Creek Friends Meetinghouse, Union Bridge
Sandy Spring Friends Meetinghouse, Sandy Spring
Third Haven Meeting House, Easton, Talbot County
West Nottingham Meetinghouse, Rising Sun, Cecil County
Massachusetts
Amesbury Friends Meeting House, Amesbury, Essex County
Apponegansett Meeting House, Dartmouth, Bristol County
East Blackstone Friends Meetinghouse, Blackstone, Worcester County
East Hoosac Quaker Meeting House, Adams, Berkshire County
Long Plain Friends Meetinghouse, Acushnet, Bristol County
Pembroke Friends Meetinghouse, Pembroke, Plymouth County
Salem Friends Meeting House, Salem, Essex County, (relocated to grounds of Peabody Essex Museum)
Uxbridge Friends Meeting House, Uxbridge, Worcester County
Michigan
Raisin Valley Friends Meetinghouse, Adrian Charter, Lenawee County
New Hampshire
Dover Friends Meetinghouse, Dover, Strafford County
New Jersey
Alloways Creek Friends Meetinghouse, Hancock's Bridge, Salem County
Arney's Mount Friends Meetinghouse and Burial Ground, Burlington County
Atlantic City Area Monthly Meeting, Atlantic County
Barnegat Monthly Meeting, Ocean County
Cropwell Friends Meeting House, Cropwell, Burlington County
Evesham Friends Meeting House, Mount Laurel, Burlington County
Haddonfield Friends Meeting House, Haddonfield, Camden County
Little Egg Harbor Friends Meeting House, Tuckerton, Ocean County
Moorestown Friends School and Meetinghouse, Moorestown
Newton Friends' Meetinghouse, Camden
Quakertown Friends Meeting House, Quakertown, Hunterdon County
Rancocas Friends Meeting House, Rancocas, Burlington County 
Randolph Friends Meeting House, Randolph, Morris County
Seaville Friends Meeting House, Seaville, Cape May County (This 1716–1727 meeting house is the smallest frame Quaker meeting house in the United States.)
Stony Brook Meeting House and Cemetery, Princeton
Trenton Friends Meeting House, Trenton
Upper Greenwich Friends Meetinghouse, Mickleton, Gloucester County
Woodbury Friends' Meetinghouse, Woodbury, Gloucester County
New York
Amawalk Friends Meeting House, Yorktown Heights
Beekman Meeting House and Friends' Cemetery, LaGrangeville
Bethpage Friends Meeting House, Farmingdale
Boerum Friends Meeting House and School, Boerum Hill, Brooklyn, New York City
John Bowne House, Flushing, Queens, New York City (John Bowne was arrested in 1662 for hosting a meeting in his house.)
Brooklyn Friends Meeting House and School, Brooklyn, New York City
Chappaqua Friends Meeting House, Chappaqua, Westchester County, (built in 1754)
Clinton Corners Friends Church, Clinton Corners, Dutchess County
Clinton Hill Orthodox Friends Meeting House, Brooklyn, New York City (now Apostolic Faith Mission)
Cornwall Friends Meeting House, New York
Creek Meeting House and Friends' Cemetery, New York
Crum Elbow Meeting House and Cemetery, East Park, Dutchess County
Easton Friends North Meetinghouse, Middle Falls, Washington County
Farmington Quaker Crossroads Historic District, Farmington, New York, NRHP-listed
Greenfield Preparative Meeting House, Grahamsville, Sullivan County
Jericho Friends Meeting House Complex, Jericho, Nassau County
Matinecock Friends Meetinghouse, New York
Nine Partners Meeting House and Cemetery, Millbrook, Dutchess County
North Street Friends Meetinghouse, Ledyard, Cayuga County
Oblong Friends Meeting House, Pawling, Dutchess County
Old Quaker Meeting House (Queens), Flushing, Queens, New York City, NRHP-listed
Orchard Park Friends Meeting House, Orchard Park, New York, New York, FGC Affiliated
Oswego Meeting House and Friends' Cemetery, Oswego, Oswego County
Poughkeepsie Meeting House (Hooker Avenue), Poughkeepsie, Dutchess County
Poughkeepsie Meeting House (Montgomery Street), Poughkeepsie, Dutchess County
Quaker Street Historic District, Duanesburg, New York, NRHP-listed
Rye Meeting House, Rye, Westchester County
Smith Clove Meetinghouse, Highland Mills, Orange County
Society of Friends Hall, Glen Falls, Warren County
Upperville Meeting House, Upperville, Chenango County
North Carolina
Cane Creek Friends Meeting, Snow Camp
Deep River Friends Meeting House and Cemetery, High Point
Friends Spring Meeting House, Snow Camp
New Garden Meeting House, Guilford County
Springfield Friends Meeting, Guilford County
West Grove Friends Spring Meeting House, Alamance County
Ohio
Concord Hicksite Friends Meeting House, east of Colerain, Belmont County, Ohio
Green Plain Monthly Meetinghouse, South Charleston, Clark County
Mount Pleasant Friends Meeting House, Mount Pleasant, Jefferson County
Wilmington Friends Meeting House, Wilmington, Clinton County, Ohio
PennsylvaniaSee also Friends meeting houses in Pennsylvania
Abington Friends Meeting House, Jenkintown, Montgomery County
Arch Street Friends Meeting House, Philadelphia
Birmingham Friends Meetinghouse, Birmingham Township, Chester County
Buckingham Friends Meeting House, Buckingham Township, Bucks County, NRHP-listed
Birmingham Orthodox Meeting House, Birmingham Township, Chester County
Bradford Friends Meetinghouse, Marshallton, Chester County, (also called Marshallton Meeting House)
Caln Meeting House, Caln Township, Chester County
Catawissa Friends Meetinghouse, Catawissa, Columbia County
Chester Friends Meetinghouse, Chester
Chichester Friends Meetinghouse, Upper Chichester Township, Delaware County, (near Boothwyn)
Concord Friends Meetinghouse, Concordville, Delaware County
Darby Friends Meeting, Darby, Pennsylvania, Delaware County (founded 1682)
Frankford Friends Meeting House, Frankford, Philadelphia
Free Quaker Meetinghouse, Independence National Historical Park, Philadelphia, NRHP-listed 
Horsham Friends Meeting, Horsham Township, Bucks County
Makefield Meeting, Upper Makefield Township, Bucks County
Merion Friends Meeting House, Merion Station, Montgomery County
Middletown Friends Meetinghouse, Lima, Delaware County
Newtown Friends Meetinghouse, Newtown Township, Delaware County
Old Haverford Friends Meetinghouse, Havertown, Delaware County, (founded 1683)
Old Kennett Meetinghouse, Kennett Township near Chadds Ford, Chester County
Parkersville Friends Meetinghouse, Pennsbury Township, Chester County
Pittsburgh Friends Meeting, Pittsburgh, Pennsylvania
Plymouth Friends Meetinghouse, Plymouth Township, Montgomery County
Providence Quaker Cemetery and Chapel, Perryopolis, Fayette County, NRHP-listed 
Race Street Friends Meetinghouse, Philadelphia
Radnor Friends Meetinghouse, Radnor Township, Delaware County
Schuylkill Friends Meeting House, Phoenixville, Chester County
Springfield Friends Meeting House, Springfield, Delaware County
Upper Dublin Friends Meeting House, Upper Dublin Township, Montgomery County
Uwchlan Meetinghouse, Uwchlan Township, Chester County
Warrington Meetinghouse, Warrington, York County
Wrightstown Friends Meeting Complex, Wrightstown, Bucks County
York Meetinghouse, York, York County
Rhode Island
Conanicut Friends Meetinghouse, Conanicut Island, Jamestown
Friends Meeting House and Cemetery, Little Compton
Great Friends Meeting House, Newport
Portsmouth Friends Meetinghouse Parsonage and Cemetery, Portsmouth
Saylesville Meetinghouse, Saylesville
Smithfield Friends Meeting House, Parsonage and Cemetery, Smithfield
 South Carolina
 Bush River Monthly Meeting, Bush River, Newberry County, South Carolina , The State, "An Old Quaker Settlement. An Interesting Sketch of a Colony in Newberry," Columbia, South Carolina, February 8, 1897.
 Camden, Camden, Kershaw County, South Carolina Old Quaker Cemetery
Tennessee
Friends Church (Maryville, Tennessee), Maryville, Blount County, NRHP-listed. Now St. Andrew's Episcopal Church.
Texas
Live Oak Friends Meeting House, Houston Heights, Houston. Located at 1318 West 26th Street, noted for its Skyspace by artist James Turrell
Friends Meeting of San Antonio, Alamo Heights, San Antonio. Located at 7052 N Vandiver Rd, San Antonio, TX 78209
Vermont
South Starksboro Friends Meeting House and Cemetery, Starksboro, Addison County
Virginia
Hopewell Meeting House, Clear Brook, Frederick County
South River Friends Meetinghouse, Lynchburg, Campbell County
Woodlawn Quaker Meetinghouse, Fort Belvoir, Fairfax County, NRHP-listed
Washington, D.C.
Meeting House of the Friends Meeting of Washington, Washington, D.C.

References

Sources
Lippincott, Horace Mather.  Abington Friends Meeting and School: 1682–1949.  n.p.: n.p., 1949.
Rose, Harold Wickliffe. The Colonial Houses of Worship in America. New York: Hastings House, Publishers, 1963.

Lists of Christian buildings and structures
Meeting houses